Semir Mahjoub also known as Samir Mahjoub (born December 19, 1964) is a Swedish-Tunisian businessman.

Biography 

Semir Mahjoub held different positions at Ericsson between 1994 and 2000, and between 2005 and 2012, including President of mobile commerce company Ericsson Money Services. In 2000, he co-founded and was then the CEO of telecommunications software company Incomit, which was acquired by BEA Systems in 2005.

Mahjoub holds a Master’s degree in Computer Science and Engineering from Chalmers University of Technology.

References 

Swedish businesspeople
Chalmers University of Technology alumni
1964 births
Ericsson people
Living people
Tunisian businesspeople